Abbreviata is a genus of nematodes belonging to the family Physalopteridae.

The genus has almost cosmopolitan distribution.

Species:

Abbreviata abbreviata 
Abbreviata kazachstanica 
Abbreviata turkomanica

References

Nematodes